Mornington is a suburb on the Mornington Peninsula in Melbourne, Victoria, Australia,  south-east of Melbourne's Central Business District, and the most populous town in the Shire of Mornington Peninsula local government area. Mornington recorded a population of 25,759 at the 2021 census.

Mornington is known for its "village" atmosphere and its beaches. Mornington is a tourist destination with Melburnians who make day trips to visit the area's bay beaches and wineries. The town centre runs into the foreshore area and local beach.

History

Originally home to the Indigenous Boonwurrung people, the first European settlers arrived in the area in the 1840s for fishing, logging and agriculture.

A 46-meter long pier was opened in 1858 and became the social and economic gateway to the Mornington Peninsula, connecting the surrounding areas with Melbourne. Originally known as Schnapper (or Snapper) Point, the town was renamed Mornington in 1864 after the second Earl of Mornington. The Courthouse was built in 1861 and the Post Office in 1863. The Grand Hotel was originally opened in 1892 at 126 Main Street as an alcohol-free Grand Coffee Palace designed by notable Melbourne architect William Pitt. Mornington became a popular tourist destination, with day trippers travelling from Melbourne on steamers from the 1860s.

The Mornington Railway line opened in 1889, connecting the township directly to Melbourne until it was closed in 1981.

Population

In the 2016 Census, there were 23,989 people in Mornington. 72.0% of people were born in Australia. The next most common countries of birth were England 9.8%, New Zealand 1.7%, Scotland 1.4%, Ireland 0.7% and Netherlands 0.7%. 89.3% of people spoke only English at home. Other languages spoken at home included Italian 0.8%, Greek 0.6% and German 0.4%. The most common responses for religion were No Religion 36.5%, Catholic 23.0% and Anglican 16.6%.

Parks

The town centre runs into the foreshore area and local beach, which features a yacht club, restaurant and park with playground facilities.

Culture

Mornington is an attractive destination for shopping and features some excellent restaurants and cafes. The north of Mornington is also home to several horse breeders and stables. It has a library and numerous parks, gardens and historical buildings, many of which are open to the public. It holds several annual festivals, and holds a market day in the main street every Wednesday, which attracts hundreds of people.

The Mornington Peninsula Regional Gallery, opened in 1971, is the major art gallery for the region and hosts a number of major exhibitions, including the Archibald Prize in 2013. Surrounding the gallery are several parks and the Mornington Botanical Rose Gardens.

Education

Within Mornington are several schools including Mornington Primary School, Mornington Secondary College, Mornington Park Primary School, St. Macartan's Parish Primary School and Benton Junior College.

Transport

Mornington is served by three major roadways, Peninsula Link (Mornington Peninsula Freeway), Nepean Highway and Moorooduc Highway. All three are dual-carriageway arterial roads with varying speed limits of 80 km/h-100 km/h.  The Melbourne bus routes 781, 784, 785, and 788 services the area.

The Mornington railway line closed in 1981 and reopened in 1991 as the heritage Mornington Railway with the aims of restoring the line in future.

Sport

Mornington has an Australian Rules football team, the Mornington Bulldogs, competing in the Mornington Peninsula Nepean Football League.

Mornington has a horse racing club, the Mornington Racing Club, which schedules around twenty race meetings a year including the Mornington Cup meeting in March. The Mornington Racecourse also hosts the Peninsula Cup in November and monthly markets.

Mornington also has an active Yacht club, the Mornington Yacht Club, located at Schnapper Point.

Golfers play at the course of the Mornington Country Golf Club on Tallis Drive.

Mornington has a Field Hockey club competing in the Hockey Victoria Association known as the Mornington Peninsula Falcons.

Terri Sawyer, the 18-year-old female driver who won the first ever AUSCAR race at the Calder Park Thunderdome in Melbourne in February 1988, is a resident of Mornington.

Climate

Mornington has an oceanic climate (Cfb) with warm and occasionally hot summers and mild winters where temperatures below freezing are very rare occasions.

Notable residents
 Finola Moorhead
 Brodie Harper
 Terry Denton

See also
 Shire of Mornington – Mornington was previously within this former local government area.

References

Suburbs of Melbourne
Suburbs of the Shire of Mornington Peninsula
Populated places established in 1850
1850 establishments in Australia